The 1911–12 Columbia men's ice hockey season was the 16th season of play for the program.

Season
Columbia began their season with win over defending champion Cornell in convincing fashion, though the Big Red were shadows of their former selves. The Lions followed that up with a miraculous victory over Dartmouth; the greens jumped out to a 3–0 lead after the first half but the offence came alive in the second half. With Bates leading the way, Columbia scored five times and won 5–4, giving the Lions hope that they could finally break through for a championship.

The next game came against Princeton with the championship in the balance. While Yale had yet to play a game, Harvard had left the league, leaving the match between Columbia and Princeton as the deciding contest. Unfortunately the Tigers boasted the best player in college hockey and Hobey Baker led Princeton to a 6–3 victory. Bates was again a force for the Lions, recording a hat-trick, but the Tiger's offense was just too much to overcome. Columbia ensured themselves of a second-place finish when they defeated Yale in February and, despite losing the championship, the Lions were encouraged with the growth of the program over the previous two seasons.

An ill omen came later as despite possessing a good schedule, there was so little interest in the freshman hockey team that it was disbanded in mid-February.

Roster

Standings

Schedule and Results

|-
!colspan=12 style=";" | Regular Season

References

Columbia Lions men's ice hockey seasons
Columbia
Columbia
Columbia
Columbia